Houston Tumlin (December 27, 1992 – March 23, 2021) was an American actor, best known for acting in Talladega Nights: The Ballad of Ricky Bobby in 2006. Tumlin attended Victory Christian High School and graduated in 2011. He served in the U.S. Army for nearly six years and earned achievement and participation decorations as an E-4 specialist in the 101st Airborne Division, including the Achievement Medal, the National Defense Service Medal, the Global War on Terrorism Service Medal and an Air Assault Badge. According to his mother, he had post- traumatic stress disorder (PTSD) and depression after his service in the military. Tumlin died by suicide by a self-inflicted gunshot on March 23, 2021, at his home in Pelham, Alabama.

References 

1992 births
2021 deaths
2021 suicides
21st-century American male actors
American male child actors
American male film actors
People from Pelham, Alabama
People with post-traumatic stress disorder
Suicides by firearm in Alabama
United States Army soldiers